Photographic imagery of planet Earth  from outer space started  in the 1940s, first from rockets in suborbital flight, subsequently from satellites around Earth, and then from spacecraft beyond Earth's orbit.

Timeline

See also 
 List of notable images of Earth from space
 
 
 
 
 
 
 View of Earth from Mars

References 

Lists of firsts in space
Photography and videography of Earth from space
Spaceflight timelines
Image galleries
Astronomy image articles